Jedward: Let Loose is a three-part television series, following the Irish pop duo, Jedward, after their time spent on the sixth series of The X Factor, and the rise in fame they experienced. The fly-on-the-wall series also follows their lives as they produce and release their debut album and launch themselves into the fashion world.

The first series aired from Tuesday 24 August 2010, on ITV2. Jedward's road manager Liam McKenna, confirmed that there were plans to do another series of Let Loose. However it is rumoured that these plans have now been scrapped, and the series cancelled.

Overview
It was confirmed in December 2009 that the duo would have their own ITV2 documentary, produced by RDF Television. The fly-on-the-wall three part series will look at how the boys prepared for the launch of their début album, performing onstage, and dealing with their fame whilst trying to adapt to their new surroundings and independence. The series also takes a look back at their time on The X Factor, whilst documenting the time Jedward spent designing trainers for a sports label, and the production of their music videos.

Upon commission, Jedward said: "We are so excited that we have our own show. People find it hard to define us and hopefully the show will give viewers and our fans an insight into our world during a really exciting point in our lives launching our debut album."

Episodes

Reception
Ian Wylie, of The Guardian, had a mixed response to the show. Posting on his Twitter account: "Jedward: Let Loose is good. But it's not that good." 

David Quantick, of The Daily Mirror was critical of the show, and Jedward themselves. Writing in his column he described Jedward as 'vain', and criticised ITV for cancelling shows like The Bill, whilst producing a 'long, weird and increasingly scary show'. Kevin O'Sullivan, also of The Daily Mirror, was also critical of the show. He compared the show to The Saturdays: 24/7, saying both were 'dull' and he couldn't understand why anybody would tune in to watch either show.

References

External links

2010s British documentary television series
2010 British television series debuts
2010 British television series endings
English-language television shows
ITV documentaries
ITV (TV network) original programming
Jedward
Television series by Banijay